Retinoid X receptor beta (RXR-beta), also known as NR2B2 (nuclear receptor subfamily 2, group B, member 2) is a nuclear receptor that in humans is encoded by the RXRB gene.

This gene encodes a member of the retinoid X receptor (RXR) family of nuclear receptors which are involved in mediating the effects of retinoic acid (RA). This receptor forms heterodimers with the retinoic acid, thyroid hormone, and vitamin D receptors, increasing both DNA binding and transcriptional function on their respective response elements. The gene lies within the major histocompatibility complex (MHC) class II region on chromosome 6. An alternatively spliced transcript variant has been described, but its full length sequence has not been determined.

Interactive pathway map

See also 
Retinoid X receptor

References

Further reading 

 
 
 
 
 
 
 
 
 
 
 
 
 
 
 
 
 
 
 

Intracellular receptors
Transcription factors